Invitation is a 1993 album by jazz pianist Joe Sample released through Warner Bros. Records. It contains reinterpretations (remakes) of jazz standard compositions written by artists such as Duke Ellington, Johnny Mercer, among others (as listed in parentheses in the track list). Invitation is more of a jazz/classical crossover album with orchestral arrangements by Dale Oehler.

In 1993, Invitation reached No. 1 in the Top Jazz Albums chart and No. 43 in the Top R&B/Hip-Hop Albums chart in Billboard magazine. On the top albums chart, it peaked at No. 194.[]

Track listing
 "Black Is the Color" (Traditional folk song) - 3:53
 "A House Is Not a Home" (Burt Bacharach, Hal David) - 4:57
 "Come Rain or Come Shine" (Harold Arlen, Johnny Mercer) - 5:07
 "Invitation" (Bronisław Kaper) - 4:21
 "Summertime" (George Gershwin, Ira Gershwin, DuBose Heyward, Dorothy Heyward) - 6:49
 "Nica's Dream" (Horace Silver) - 5:20
 "Stormy Weather" (Harold Arlen, Ted Koehler) - 5:01
 "Django" (John Lewis) - 3:45
 "My One and Only Love" (Guy Wood, Robert Mellin) - 6:12
 "Mood Indigo" (Duke Ellington, Barney Bigard, Irving Mills) - 4:26

Personnel
 Joe Sample – piano, synthesizer
 Lenny Castro – percussion
 Victor Lewis – drums
 Cecil McBee – bass
 Dale Oehler – conductor

Chart performance

References

1993 albums
Joe Sample albums
Albums produced by Tommy LiPuma
Warner Records albums